In differential geometry, the Schouten–Nijenhuis bracket, also known as the Schouten bracket, is a type of graded Lie bracket defined on multivector fields on a smooth manifold extending the Lie bracket of vector fields.  There are two  different versions, both rather confusingly called by the same name. The most common version is  defined on alternating multivector fields and makes them into a Gerstenhaber algebra, but there is also another version defined on symmetric multivector fields, which is more or less the same as the Poisson bracket on the cotangent bundle.  It was invented by  Jan Arnoldus Schouten (1940, 1953) and its properties were investigated by his student Albert Nijenhuis (1955). It is related to but not the same as the Nijenhuis–Richardson bracket and the Frölicher–Nijenhuis bracket.

Definition and properties
An alternating multivector field is a section of the exterior algebra ∧∗TM over the tangent bundle of a manifold M.  The alternating multivector fields form a graded supercommutative ring with the product of a and b written as ab (some authors use a∧b).  This is dual to the usual algebra of differential forms Ω∗M by the pairing on homogeneous elements:
 

The skew symmetric Schouten–Nijenhuis bracket is the unique extension of the Lie bracket of vector fields to a graded bracket on the space of alternating multivector fields that makes the alternating multivector fields into a Gerstenhaber algebra.
It is given in terms of the Lie bracket of vector fields by 

for vector fields ai, bj and

for vector fields  and smooth function , where   is the common interior product operator.   
It has  the following properties.
|ab| = |a| + |b|      (The product has degree 0)
|[a,b]| = |a| + |b| − 1  (The Schouten–Nijenhuis bracket has degree −1)
(ab)c = a(bc), ab = (−1)|a||b|ba  (the product is associative and (super) commutative)
[a, bc] = [a, b]c + (−1)|b|(|a| − 1)b[a, c] (Poisson identity)
[a,b] = −(−1)(|a| − 1)(|b| − 1) [b,a] (Antisymmetry of Schouten–Nijenhuis bracket)
[[a,b],c] = [a,[b,c]] − (−1)(|a| − 1)(|b| − 1)[b,[a,c]]  (Jacobi identity for Schouten–Nijenhuis bracket)
 If f and g are functions (multivectors homogeneous of degree 0), then [f,g] = 0.
 If a is a vector field, then [a,b] = Lab is the usual Lie derivative of the multivector field b along a, and in particular if a and b are vector fields then the Schouten–Nijenhuis bracket is the usual Lie bracket of vector fields.

The Schouten–Nijenhuis bracket makes the multivector fields into a Lie superalgebra if the grading 
is changed to the one of opposite parity (so that the even and odd subspaces are switched), though
with this new grading it is no longer a supercommutative ring.  Accordingly, the Jacobi identity may also be expressed in the symmetrical form

Generalizations
There is a common generalization of the Schouten–Nijenhuis bracket for alternating multivector fields and the Frölicher–Nijenhuis bracket due to Vinogradov (1990).

A version of the Schouten–Nijenhuis bracket can also be defined for symmetric multivector fields in a similar way. The symmetric multivector fields can be identified with  functions on the cotangent space T*(M) of M that are polynomial in the fiber, and under this identification the symmetric Schouten–Nijenhuis bracket corresponds to the Poisson bracket of functions on the symplectic manifold T*(M).
There is a common generalization of the Schouten–Nijenhuis bracket for symmetric multivector fields and the Frölicher–Nijenhuis bracket due to Dubois-Violette and Peter W. Michor (1995).

References

External links
Nicola Ciccoli Schouten–Nijenhuis bracket in notes on From Poisson to Quantum Geometry

Bilinear maps
Differential geometry